Blanca Fernández Ochoa (22 April 1963 – August 2019) was a World Cup alpine ski racer from Spain. Born in Madrid, she competed in four Winter Olympics, from 1980 through 1992.

Career
Her four siblings all competed in alpine ski racing for Spain in the Winter Olympics: Dolores, Francisco, Juan Manuel, and Luis. Francisco (1950-2006) won the gold medal in slalom at the 1972 Olympics in Sapporo, Japan.

She received the Premio Reina Sofía for best athlete in 1983 and 1988 by Consejo Superior de Deportes at Premios Nacionales del Deporte. She also received the Real Orden del Mérito Deportivo in 1994. At the 1992 Olympics at Albertville, France, Blanca won the bronze medal in slalom.

During her World Cup career, she had 4 victories, 20 podiums, and 69 top ten finishes.

On July 18, 1991, she married Italian Daniel Fioretto in the Monastery of El Escorial. They ended up divorcing and she contracted a second marriage with David Fresneda, with whom she had two children, David (born 2000) and Olivia (born 1999), although this marriage also ended in divorce. The children live with their father.

She was reported as missing on 23 August 2019 and found dead by a police officer on 4 September 2019 near La Peñota, in the Guadarrama Mountains. Policía Nacional believed it was not an accidental death in a safe area and there were not traumas. On 5 September 2019 it was declared she died from a suicide because lithium tablets and a bottle of wine were found near her body. She died the same day of the disappearance at the age of 56.

World Cup results

Season standings

Points were only awarded for top ten finishes thru 1979, top 15 thru 1991 (see scoring system).

Race victories
 4 wins (1 GS, 3 SL)
 20 podiums (12 GS, 8 SL), 69 top tens

World Championship results 

From 1948 through 1980, the Winter Olympics were also the World Championships for alpine skiing.
At the World Championships from 1954 through 1980, the combined was a "paper race" using the results of the three events (DH, GS, SL).

Olympic results

See also
 List of solved missing person cases
 List of Olympic medalist families

References

External links

Blanca Fernandez-Ochoa World Cup standings at the International Ski Federation

1963 births
2010s missing person cases
2019 deaths
Alpine skiers at the 1980 Winter Olympics
Alpine skiers at the 1984 Winter Olympics
Alpine skiers at the 1988 Winter Olympics
Alpine skiers at the 1992 Winter Olympics
Formerly missing people
Competitors at the 1985 Winter Universiade
Medalists at the 1992 Winter Olympics
Missing person cases in Spain
Olympic alpine skiers of Spain
Olympic bronze medalists for Spain
Olympic medalists in alpine skiing
Spanish female alpine skiers
Sportspeople from Madrid
Universiade bronze medalists for Spain
Universiade medalists in alpine skiing
2019 suicides
Drug-related suicides in Spain